Hans Gildemeister and Andrés Gómez were the defending champions, but lost in the quarterfinals to Jimmy Arias and Eliot Teltscher.

Guy Forget and Yannick Noah won the title by defeating Gary Donnelly and Peter Fleming 4–6, 6–4, 6–1 in the final.

Seeds

Draw

Finals

Top half

Bottom half

References

External links
 Official results archive (ATP)
 Official results archive (ITF)

World Championship Tennis Tournament of Champions
1987 Grand Prix (tennis)